"May You Always" is a popular song by Larry Markes (lyrics) and Dick Charles (pseudonym of Richard Charles Krieg), published in 1958.

The biggest hit version in the United States was by the McGuire Sisters  where it peaked at No. 11 on the Billboard Hot 100.  
In the United Kingdom, Joan Regan took her version to No. 9 in the UK Singles Chart.

Cover versions
The song has also been covered by: Bobby Vinton, Maureen Evans, the Lennon Sisters, Anita Bryant, Barbara Cook, David Carroll, and Ian McNabb.

References

{Sheet Music distributed by HPhal Leonard Publishing Corporation Copyright by Colby Music, Inc & Anne-Rachel Music Corp. 1958}

1959 songs
Songs written by Larry Markes
Songs written by Dick Charles
The McGuire Sisters songs